Niclas Jonasson (born 14 June 1976) is a Swedish orienteering competitor and world champion.

He received a gold medal in sprint at the 2004 World Orienteering Championships, and gold medal in relay in 2003, as a member of the Swedish winning team. He received bronze medals in relay at the 2004 and 2006 world championships, and a gold medal in relay at the European Orienteering Championships in 2006.

References

External links
 
 
 Niclas Jonasson's home site 

1976 births
Living people
Swedish orienteers
Male orienteers
Foot orienteers
World Orienteering Championships medalists
Competitors at the 2001 World Games
World Games bronze medalists
World Games medalists in orienteering